Li Peng (20 October 1928 – 22 July 2019) was a Chinese politician who served as the fourth Premier of the People's Republic of China from 1987 to 1998, and as the Chairman of the Standing Committee of the National People's Congress, China's top legislative body, from 1998 to 2003. For much of the 1990s Li was ranked second in the Chinese Communist Party (CCP) hierarchy behind then Party General Secretary Jiang Zemin. He retained his seat on the CCP Politburo Standing Committee until his retirement in 2002.

Li was the son of an early Communist revolutionary, Li Shuoxun, who was executed by the Kuomintang. After meeting Zhou Enlai in Sichuan, Li was raised by Zhou and his wife, Deng Yingchao. Li trained to be an engineer in the USSR and worked at an important national power company after returning to China. He escaped the political turmoil of the 1950s, 1960s, and 1970s due to his political connections and his employment in the company. After Deng Xiaoping became China's leader in the late 1970s, Li took a number of increasingly important and powerful political positions, eventually becoming premier in 1987.

As Premier, Li was the most visible representative of China's government who backed the use of force to quell the Tiananmen Square protests of 1989. During the protests, Li used his authority as premier to declare martial law and, in cooperation with Deng, who was the Chairman of the Central Military Commission, ordered the June 1989 military crackdown against student pro-democracy demonstrators in Tiananmen Square, leading to a massacre. Li advocated a largely conservative approach to Chinese economic reform, which placed him at odds with General Secretary Zhao Ziyang, who fell out of favour in 1989. After Zhao was removed from office, Li promoted a conservative socialist economic agenda but lost influence to incoming vice-premier Zhu Rongji, and was unable to prevent the increasing market liberalization of the Chinese economy. During his time in office, he helmed the controversial Three Gorges Dam project. He and his family managed a large Chinese power monopoly, which the Chinese government broke up after his term as premier expired. Li died at the age of 90 in Beijing.

Childhood
Li was born as Li Yuanpeng at Family house in Shanghai French Concession, Now in 545 Yanan Road, Huangpu District in Shanghai, with ancestral roots in Chengdu, Sichuan. He was the son of Li Shuoxun, one of the earliest CCP revolutionaries, who was the political commissar of the Twentieth Division during the Nanchang uprising, and Zhao Juntao, also an early Communist operative. In 1931, Li's father, then working undercover in Hainan, was captured and executed by the Kuomintang. Li was believed to have met Deng Yingchao, wife of senior Communist leader Zhou Enlai, in Chengdu in 1939, who then took him to Chongqing to meet Zhou. Zhou was in the Communist base of Yan'an, and they did not meet until late 1940. In 1941, when Li was twelve, Zhou sent Li to Yan'an, where Li studied until 1945. As a seventeen-year-old, in 1945, Li joined the Chinese Communist Party.

Early career
In 1941, Li Peng began studying at the Yan'an Institute of Natural Science (a predecessor of the Beijing Institute of Technology). In July 1946, Li was sent to work in Zhangjiakou. According to his own recollection, in 1947, he journeyed through Shandong and North Korea, eventually ending up in Harbin where he began managing some work for a lard processing plant. In 1948, Li Peng was sent to study at the Moscow Power Engineering Institute, majoring in hydroelectric engineering. A year later, in 1949, Zhou Enlai became Premier of the newly declared People's Republic of China. Li graduated in 1954. During his time in the Soviet Union, Li was the head of the Chinese Students Association in the Soviet Union.

When Li returned to China in 1955, the country was firmly under the control of the Communist Party. Li took part in technical, then management work in the power industry, beginning his career in Northeast China.  At the outset of the Cultural Revolution, Li was sent to Beijing to head up the municipal power bureau. He played a leading role in the construction of the Tuhe Powerplant in Tangshan and the Gaojing Powerplant in Beijing. During his time at Gaojing, he worked three days and three nights supervising the construction of the site. On 4 October 1974, he was struck by a vehicle while riding his bicycle home from work. In 1976, Li was dispatched to affected regions of the Tangshan earthquake as head of the power restoration efforts.

Li advanced politically after the ascent of Deng Xiaoping, and served as the Vice-Minister and Minister of Power between 1979 and 1983. In 1982–1983 Li served as the vice-minister of Water Conservancy and Power. Much of Li's rapid political promotion was due to the support of Party elder Chen Yun.

Li joined the Central Committee at the Twelfth National Congress in 1982. In 1985 he was named minister of the State Education Commission, and was elected to the Politburo and the Party Secretariat. In 1987 Li became a member of the powerful Standing Committee.

Premiership

Defender of state control

In November 1987, after Premier Zhao Ziyang was promoted to General Secretary, Li became acting Premier. He was formally elected Premier in March 1988.  Within a year of this promotion, Li would play a major role in ending Zhao's career, after Zhao publicly supported demonstrators in Tiananmen Square. At the time of his promotion, Li seemed like an unusual choice for Premier because he did not seem to share Deng's enthusiasm for introducing market reforms. Li was raised to the position of Premier thanks partially to the departure of Hu Yaobang, who was forced to resign as General Secretary after the Party blamed him for a series of student-led protests in 1987.

Throughout the 1980s, political dissent and social problems, including inflation, urban migration, and school overcrowding, became great problems in China. Despite these acute challenges, Li shifted his focus away from the day-to-day concerns of energy, communications, and raw materials allocation, and took a more active role in the ongoing intra-party debate on the pace of market reforms. Politically, Li opposed the modern economic reforms pioneered by Zhao Ziyang throughout Zhao's years of public service.  While students and intellectuals urged greater reforms, some party elders increasingly feared that the instability opened up by any significant reforms would threaten to undermine the authority of the Communist Party, which Li had spent his career attempting to strengthen.

After Zhao became General Secretary of the Chinese Communist Party, his proposals in May 1988 to expand free enterprise led to popular complaints (which some suggest were politically inspired) about inflation fears. Public fears about the negative effects of market reforms gave conservatives (including Li Peng) the opening to call for greater centralization of economic controls and stricter prohibitions against Western influences, especially opposing further expansion of Zhao's more free enterprise-oriented approach. This precipitated a political debate, which grew more heated through the winter of 1988–1989.

Tiananmen Square

The Tiananmen Square protests of 1989 began with the mass mourning over the death of former General secretary Hu Yaobang, widely perceived to have been purged for his support of political liberalization. On the eve of Hu's funeral, 100,000 people gathered at Tiananmen Square. Beijing students began the demonstrations to encourage continued economic reform and liberalization, and these demonstrations soon evolved into a mass movement for political reform. From Tiananmen Square, the protesters later expanded into the surrounding streets. Non-violent protests also occurred in cities throughout China, including Shanghai and Wuhan. Rioting occurred in Xi'an and Changsha.

The Tiananmen protests were partially protests against the affluence of the children of high-ranking Communist Party officials, and the perception that second-generation officials had received their fortunes through exploiting their parents' influence. Li, whose family has often been at the center of corruption allegations within the Chinese power industry, was vulnerable to these charges.

An editorial published in the People's Daily on 26 April and bearing the name of Deng Xiaoping, denounced the demonstrations as "premeditated and organized turmoil with anti-Party and anti-socialist motives". This article had the effect of worsening the demonstrations by angering its leaders, who then made their demands more extreme. Zhao Ziyang later wrote in his autobiography that, although Deng had stated many of these sentiments in a private conversation with Li Peng shortly before the editorial was written, Li had these comments disseminated to Party members and published as the editorial without Deng's knowledge or consent.

Li strictly refused to negotiate with the Tiananmen protesters out of principle, and became one of the officials most objected to by protesters. One of the protest's key leaders, Wu'erkaixi, during a hunger strike, publicly scolded Li on National Television, saying he was ignoring the needs of the people. Some observers say that Wang's statements insulted Li personally, hardening his resolve to end the protest by violent means.

Among the other senior members of the central government, Li became the one who most strongly favored violence and known as the "Butcher of Beijing" for his role in the crackdown. After winning the support of most of his colleagues, apparently including Deng Xiaoping, Li officially declared martial law in Beijing on 20 May 1989 and the protests were crushed by the military on 3–4 June.  Most estimates of the dead range from several hundred to several thousand people. Li later described the crackdown as a historic victory for Communism, and wrote that he feared the protests would be as potentially damaging to China as the Cultural Revolution (1966–1976) had been.

Political longevity

Although the Tiananmen crackdown was an "international public relations disaster for China", it ensured that Li would have a long and productive career. He remained powerful, even though he had been one of the main targets of protesters, partially because the leadership believed that limiting Li's career would be the same as admitting that they had made mistakes by suppressing the 1989 protests. By keeping Li at the upper levels of the Party, China's leaders communicated to the world that the country remained stable and united.

In the immediate aftermath of the Tiananmen protests, Li took a leading role in a national austerity program, intended to slow economic growth and inflation and re-centralize the economy. Li worked to increase taxes on agriculture and export-industries, and increased salaries to less-efficient industries owned by the government. Li directed a tight monetary policy, implementing price controls on many commodities, supporting higher interest rates, and cutting off state loans to private and cooperative sectors in attempts to reduce inflation.

Li suffered a heart attack in 1993, and began to lose influence within the Party to vice-premier Zhu Rongji, a strong advocate for economic liberalization. In that year, when Li made his annual work report to the Politburo, he was forced to make over seventy changes to make the plans acceptable to Deng. Perhaps realizing that opposition to the market reforms would be poorly received by Deng and other Party elders, Li publicly supported Deng's economic reforms. Li was reappointed Premier in 1993, despite a large protest vote for Zhu. Zhu Rongji eventually succeeded Li when Li's second term expired, in 1998.

Li began two megaprojects when he was the Premier. He initiated the construction of the Three Gorges Dam on 14 December 1994, and later began preparations for the Shenzhou Manned Space Program. Both programs were subject to much controversy within China and abroad. The Shenzhou program was especially criticized due to its extraordinary cost (tens of billions of dollars). Many economists and humanitarians suggested that those billions in capital might be better invested in helping the Chinese population deal with economic hardships and improvement in the China's education, health services, and legal system.

Chairmanship of the National People's Congress
Li remained premier until 1998, when he was constitutionally limited to two terms. After his second term expired, he became the chairman of the National People's Congress. Support for Li for the largely ceremonial position was low, as he only received less than 90% of the vote at the 1998 National People's Congress, where he was the only candidate. He spent much of his time monitoring what he considered his life's work to have been, the Three Gorges Dam. Li's interest in the Dam reflected his earlier career as a hydraulic engineer, and he spent much of his career while in office presiding over a vast and growing power industry. At this time Li Peng considered himself to be a builder and a modernizer.

Legacy and death
After retiring in 2003, Li retained some influence in the Politburo Standing Committee. Luo Gan, who presided over law enforcement and national security between 2002 and 2007, was considered Li's protégé. Following the retirement of Luo Gan after 17th Party Congress, Li's influence waned considerably. He was subject to frequent speculation over corruption issues that plague him and his family. In addition, perhaps more than any other leader, Li's public image had become inextricably associated with memory of the 1989 Tiananmen crackdown, and as a result he continued to be a widely despised figure among a substantial segment of the Chinese population well into the 21st century. He was generally unpopular in China, where he (had) "has long been a figure of scorn and suspicion".

Li spent much of the 1990s expanding and managing an energy monopoly, State Power Corporation of China. Because the company was staffed by Li's relatives, Li was accused of turning China's energy industry into a "family fiefdom". At its height, Li's power company controlled 72% of all energy-producing assets in China, and was ranked as the sixtieth-largest company in the world by Fortune magazine.  After Li's departure from government, Li's energy monopoly was split into five smaller companies by the Chinese government.

In 2010, Li's autobiographical work, The Critical Moment – Li Peng Diaries, was published by New Century Press. The Critical Moment covered Li's activities during the period of the Tiananmen Square protests, and was published on the protests' twenty-first anniversary. The Critical Moment was characterized by reviewers as largely an attempt to minimize Li's culpability during the most egregious stages of the crackdown; some also say he attempted to shift blame to Deng. He reappeared at the 19th Party Congress on 18 October 2017, marking his last public appearance prior to his death.

Li died on 22 July 2019 at the age of 90. He had been receiving medical treatment in a hospital in Beijing at the time of his death. His funeral was held on 29 July 2019.

Family
Li Peng was married to Zhu Lin, a deputy manager in "a large firm in the south of China". Li and Zhu had 3 children: Li's elder son, Li Xiaopeng; Li's daughter, Li Xiaolin; and, Li's younger son, Li Xiaoyong. Li Xiaoyong is married to Ye Xiaoyan, the daughter of Communist veteran Ye Ting's second son, Ye Zhengming.

Li's family benefited from Li's high position during the 1980s and 1990s.  Two of Li's children, Li Xiaopeng and Li Xiaolin, inherited and ran two of China's electrical monopolies. State-run Chinese media have publicly questioned whether it is in China's long-term interest to preserve the "new class of monopoly state capitalists" that Li's family represents. Li Xiaopeng entered politics in Shanxi and became its governor in 2012 and then in 2016, he became Minister of Transport. Li Xiaolin served as chief executive of China Power International Development, before being transferred out in 2016 to a minor executive post at a different power company.

Honours 
:
 Order of Merit (10 May 1997)
:
 Order of Ouissam Alaouite (4 October 1995)
:
 Nishan-e-Pakistan (10 April 1999)
:
 Order of the Sun of Peru (9 October 1995)
:
 Medal of Pushkin (31 October 2007)
:
 Order of the Republic (21 May 1984)
:
 Order of the Liberator (13 November 1996)
:
 Order of the Yugoslav Star (12 June 2000)

See also
 Politics of the People's Republic of China
 History of the People's Republic of China (1989-2002)
 Premier of the PRC

References

Citations

Bibliography 
 "Li Peng, the 'Butcher of Tiananmen,' was 'Ready to Die' to Stop the Student Turmoil".  AsiaNews.it.  2003.  Retrieved 21 August 2011.
 "32: Li Peng"  Asiaweek.com. 1999.  Retrieved 10 September 2011.
 Barnouin, Barbara and Yu Changgen. (2006). Zhou Enlai: A Political Life. Hong Kong: Chinese University of Hong Kong. .  Retrieved 12 March 2011.
 Bartke, Wolfgang. (1987). Who's Who in the People's Republic of China. K.G. Saur. 
 "China's Parliament Embarrasses Li Peng".BBC News.  15 March 1998.  Retrieved 10 September 2011.
 Becker, Jasper. "Protests Spread in China". Tn The Manchester Guardian Weekly. 30 April 1989.
 Bezlova, Antoaneta.  "China Corruption Probes Signal Power Plays".  Asia Times Online.  1 November 2002.  Retrieved 19 August 2011.
 Bezlova, Antoneta. "The Princeling and the Protesters".  Asia Times Online.  19 January 2002.  Retrieved 19 August 2011.
 Bristow, Michael.  "Tiananmen Leader's 'Diary' Revealed".  BBC News.  4 June 2010.  Retrieved 21 August 2011.
 "'Downsizing' the Chinese State: Government Retrenchment in the 1990s".  The China Quarterly.  Issue 175.  Cambridge University Press.  2003.
 "The Man Who Took on the Dissidents: Li Peng (1928–)" CNN.com.  2001.  Retrieved 21 August 2008.
 Europa World Yearbook. Taylor & Francis.  2004. 
 Fang, Percy Jucheng, and Fang, Lucy Guinong. (1986). Zhou Enlai: A Profile. Foreign Languages Press.
 Keesing's Record of World Events. Volume 35. 1989.
 Lam, Willy.  "China's Elite Economic Double Standard".  Asia Times Online.  17 August 2007.  Retrieved 18 August 2011.
 Lan, Chen.  "Pre-Shenzhou Studies". Shenzhou History.  2004.  Retrieved 21 August 2011.
 Li Jing. "Li Peng Finally Denies Old Rumours He Is Ex-Premier Zhou Enlai's Adopted Son". South China Morning Post. 1 July 2014. Retrieved 18 July 2014.
 Mackerras, Colin, Donald Hugh McMillen, and Donal Andrew Watson. Dictionary of the Politics of the People's Republic of China. Great Britain: Routelage. 1998. Retrieved 4 November 2011.
 Nathan, Andrew J. "The Tiananmen Papers". Foreign Affairs.  January/February 2001.  Retrieved 3 November 2010
 
 Pikcunas, Dr. Diane D. "Chinas Great Leap Backward". Freeman: Ideas on Liberty. December 1989. Vol 39; issue 12. Retrieved 4 November 2011.
 Wang Yongxia. "Li Xiaopeng Takes the Post of Vice-Governor of Shanxi, Promises to be "a Good Public Servant". Xinhuanet.  13 June 2008.  Retrieved 27 October 2011. [Chinese]
 Wu, Jeff. "Three Gorges Dam". The Claremont Port Side. 28 November 2007.
 Xinhua. "Li Xiaopeng Appointed Acting Governor of Shanxi". China Daily. 19 December 2012. Retrieved 18 July 2014.
 "Li Peng's Biography". Xinhuanet. 15 January 2002. Retrieved 21 December 2010.
 Zhao Ziyang. Prisoner of the State: The Secret Journal of Premier Zhao Ziyang. Trans & Ed. Bao Pu, Renee Chiang, and Adi Ignatius.   New York: Simon and Schuster. 2009.

External links
Li Peng human rights lawsuit
Li Peng biography @ China Vitae, the web's largest online database of China VIPs 
Corpus of Political Speeches  Free access to political speeches by Li Peng and other Chinese politicians, developed by Hong Kong Baptist University Library

 
 

 
 

 
 

 

1928 births
2019 deaths
.
Premiers of the People's Republic of China
Chinese Communist Party politicians from Shanghai
Chairmen of the Standing Committee of the National People's Congress
People's Republic of China politicians from Shanghai
Ministers of Education of the People's Republic of China
20th-century Chinese heads of government
Members of the 15th Politburo Standing Committee of the Chinese Communist Party
Members of the 14th Politburo Standing Committee of the Chinese Communist Party
Members of the 13th Politburo Standing Committee of the Chinese Communist Party
Members of the 12th Politburo of the Chinese Communist Party
Moscow Power Engineering Institute alumni
Burials at Babaoshan Revolutionary Cemetery
Zhou Enlai
Chinese expatriates in the Soviet Union
Recipients of the Order of the Sun of Peru
Recipients of the Medal of Pushkin
Chinese diarists
Foreign recipients of the Nishan-e-Pakistan
Politicide perpetrators